The Bhutanese Citizenship Act may refer to:
 The Bhutanese Citizenship Act 1958
 The Bhutanese Citizenship Act 1985